Athletic Park was a sports stadium in New Orleans, Louisiana which opened in 1901. Some sources say the ballpark was located on the south side of Tulane Avenue between South Carrollton Avenue and South Pierce Street. The Sanborn map from 1908 shows the actual boundaries as Tulane Avenue (northeast, right field), Scott Street (southeast, first base), the proposed Gravier Street extension, and then railroad tracks and the canal (southwest, third base); and the proposed Pierce Street extension (northwest, overlapping left field). Carrolton Avenue was a block west of Pierce. 

When the Pelicans moved a few blocks up the street to Pelican Park, this site was replaced by an amusement park called White City. The Pelicans would move back to this area a few years later and build a new facility called Heinemann Park.

It was home to the New Orleans Pelicans baseball organization from 1901 to 1908. It was also home to the Tulane Green Wave football team from 1901 to 1908. 

It was the spring training home of the Cleveland Indians from 1902 to 1903.

See also
New Orleans Pelicans (baseball)
Tulane Green Wave football
Sports in New Orleans

External links
Sanborn map showing Athletic Park, 1908

References

New Orleans Pelicans (baseball) stadiums
Tulane Green Wave football venues
American football venues in New Orleans
Baseball venues in New Orleans
Defunct baseball venues in the United States
Defunct minor league baseball venues
Defunct college football venues
Defunct sports venues in New Orleans
Demolished sports venues in Louisiana
Sports venues completed in 1901
1901 establishments in Louisiana